Kim Su-jin or Kim Soo-jon may refer to:

 Kim Soo-jin (actress) (born 1974), South Korean actress
 Kim Su-jin (curler) (born 1999), South Korean curler
 Kim Su-jin (swimmer) (born 1974), South Korean swimmer